Anndi Lynn McAfee (born September 28, 1979) is an American actress. She is best known for voicing Phoebe Heyerdahl in Nickelodeon's animated television series Hey Arnold! and associated media, as well as the second voice of Cera in The Land Before Time series (1997–present), replacing Candace Hutson.

Life and career
McAfee was born on September 28, 1979, in Los Angeles, California with Type 1 Gaucher's disease. She started performing on stage when she was seven years old and began working on film projects a year later. She has been seen and heard in many commercials, films and television series. Upon being diagnosed with Gaucher's disease at the age of 17, McAfee would primarily do voice-over work going forward.

In 1992, the true crime made-for-television film When No One Would Listen was nominated for a Young Artist Award for Best Actress in a Television Movie, owing to Anndi McAfee's acting in the role of the main lead's young daughter, Maggie Cochran. McAfee's performance was well-received by critics, despite it being one of her earliest acting roles. In 2004, McAfee graduated from California State University, Northridge with an M.A. degree in communication studies.

In 2014, McAfee posted a cover of "Let It Go" from Disney's 2013 film Frozen on her blog. In 2015, she signed with a New York voiceover agency, Don Buchwald, and now splits her time between Los Angeles and New York City.

Filmography

Films

Television

Video games

References

External links
 
 

1979 births
Living people
Actresses from Los Angeles
American child actresses
American film actresses
American television actresses
American video game actresses
American voice actresses
California State University, Northridge alumni
20th-century American actresses
21st-century American actresses